The publication name The Communist may refer to:
 The Communist (UK) — weekly organ of the Communist Party of Great Britain (1920–1923)
 The Communist (US):
 Series of publications issued by the Communist Party USA during various factional forms (1919–1923)
 CPUSA's theoretical magazine (1927–1946)
 Became Political Affairs (magazine)
 The Communist (Australia), Australian Communist Party organ from 1921 to 1923. Presently known as Tribune

See also 
 The Communist (film), Soviet film